Haven Institute and Conservatory of Music was a private historically black Methodist college in Meridian, Mississippi founded in 1865 by Moses Austin, a pastor of the Saint Paul Methodist Episcopal Church of Meridian and an ex-slave. Originally called Meridian Academy and located at 27th Avenue and 13th Street, the name was changed in 1914 when Haven Academy of Waynesboro, Georgia merged with Clark University of Atlanta, Georgia.

History
A 1917 report published by the United States Office of Education recorded M. S. Davage as the school's principal. The report was published in 1917 and its Haven Institute documentation was from a 1914 visit.  The report states the  school spent too much time teaching "ancient languages" and recommended more industrial education programs such as cooking, sewing, and gardening.

The school's growth was hampered for lack of adequate room for expansion for classrooms and dormitories, forcing it to turn down applicants. To remedy this, in 1921 the Board of Education for Negroes of the Methodist Episcopal Church (originally the Freedmen's Aid Society) purchased the 100-acre campus of the defunct Meridian Female College a mile outside of the city. A large conservatory of music was included, with a pipe organ, numerous pianos and other musical equipment, and the school opened the Haven Conservatory of Music, directed by the Rev. William A. Sykes. The original building was sold to the church.

The school closed in the early 1930s because of financial pressures caused by the Great Depression.

References

Historically black universities and colleges in the United States
Universities and colleges affiliated with the African Methodist Episcopal Church